Ardakhshir I (also spelled Artaxerxes I; Aramaic: rtḥštry) was a dynast (frataraka) of Persis in the late 3rd-century BC, ruling sometime after 220 to .

Name 
Ardakhshir (Ardashir) is the Middle Persian form of the Old Persian Ṛtaxšira (also spelled Artaxšaçā, meaning "whose reign is through truth"). Three kings of the Achaemenid Empire were known to have the same name.

Reign 
Since the end of the 3rd or the beginning of the 2nd century BCE, Persis had been ruled by local dynasts subject to the Seleucid Empire. They held the ancient Persian title of frataraka ("leader, governor, forerunner"), which is also attested in the Achaemenid-era. The Achaemenid Empire, which had a century earlier ruled most of the Near East, originated from the region. The frataraka themselves emphasized their close affiliation with the prominent Achaemenid king of kings, and their court was probably at the former Achaemenid capital of Persepolis, where they financed construction projects on and near the Achaemenid plateau. The frataraka had traditionally been regarded as priestly dynasts or advocates of religious (and political) opposition to Hellenism, however, this is no longer considered the case.

The chronology of the early Persid rulers is disputed. The traditional view was that the chronology of the early rulers were; Baydad, Ardakhshir I, Wahbarz, Wadfradad I and Wadfradad II. However, recent findings of Persis coins have led to more a likely chronology; Ardakhshir I, Wahbarz, Wadfradad I, Baydad and Wadfradad II.

References

Sources 
 .
 
 
 
 
 
 
 

3rd-century BC Iranian people
History of Fars Province
Seleucid Empire
3rd-century BC rulers in Asia
Zoroastrian rulers
Frataraka rulers of Persis